Neurigoninae is a subfamily of flies in the family Dolichopodidae.

Genera
 Tribe Coeloglutini Negrobov, 1986
 Coeloglutus Aldrich, 1896
 Mberu Capellari & Amorim, 2011
 Neotonnoiria Robinson, 1970
 Paracoeloglutus Naglis, 2001
 Tribe Dactylomyiini Naglis, 2002
 Argentinia Parent, 1931
 Dactylomyia Aldrich, 1894
 Macrodactylomyia Naglis, 2002
 Systenoides Naglis, 2002
 Tribe Neurigonini Aldrich, 1905
 Arachnomyia White, 1916
 Bickelomyia Naglis, 2002
 Halteriphorus Parent, 1933
 Naticornus Olejníček, 2005
 Neurigona Rondani, 1856
 Oncopygius Mik, 1866
 Viridigona Naglis, 2003

References 

 
Dolichopodidae subfamilies